Jami Beth Gertz (born October 28, 1965) is an American actress. Gertz is known for her early roles in the films Crossroads, The Lost Boys, Less than Zero and Quicksilver, the 1980s TV series Square Pegs and 1996's Twister, as well as for her roles as Judy Miller in the CBS sitcom Still Standing and as Debbie Weaver in the ABC sitcom The Neighbors. Along with husband Tony Ressler, she is a part-owner of the Atlanta Hawks of the National Basketball Association.

Early life
Gertz was born in Chicago, Illinois, and lived in the suburb of Glenview. She attended public schools, graduating from Maine East High School. Her parents are Sharyn and Walter Gertz, who was a builder and contractor, and she has two brothers, Michael and Scott. Gertz, who is Jewish, was raised in Conservative Judaism.

Career
She was discovered in a nationwide talent search by Norman Lear and studied drama at NYU.
As a child actor, Gertz was in one episode of Diff'rent Strokes along with Andrew Dice Clay. She also had a recurring role on The Facts of Life as Blair's friend and fellow schoolmate Boots St. Clair. Gertz made her film debut in the 1981 romance film Endless Love, which was followed by a co-starring role in the 1982–83 TV sitcom series Square Pegs. She gained more significant attention with a starring role in 1987's Less than Zero, as the friend of a doomed drug addict played by Robert Downey Jr. She also starred in the 1987 film The Lost Boys as Star, the "half vampire" girlfriend, with Kiefer Sutherland and Jason Patric.

After working in Paris as a scent designer for Lanvin, Gertz returned to the United States and landed a key supporting role in the 1996 blockbuster Twister after other films including 1986's Solarbabies and Crossroads, the 1989 film Listen to Me with Kirk Cameron,  The Boyfriend School, and Jersey Girl. In the 1994 episode of Seinfeld, "The Stall", she appeared as one of Jerry's girlfriends who works as a phone sex operator and can't "spare a square" of toilet paper to Elaine in the restroom. Also in 1994 she played Sarah in the TV movie This Can't Be Love starring Katharine Hepburn, Anthony Quinn, and Jason Bateman. Gertz later played the recurring character Dr. Nina Pomerantz during the 1997 season of ER.  She reportedly was offered, but declined, the role of Rachel Green, during pre-production of Friends.

In 2000, Gertz took up a recurring role on the Fox hit Ally McBeal as Kimmy Bishop, John Cage's love interest. Gertz was nominated for an Emmy for Outstanding Guest Actress in a Comedy Series. She returned to this role in one more episode as a guest star in the show's final season in 2002. Also in 2002, she portrayed comedian Gilda Radner in the television movie Gilda Radner: It's Always Something. Gertz's character on Still Standing, Judy Miller, is named after a character Radner portrayed on Saturday Night Live. Still Standing, a television sitcom in which Gertz co-starred with Mark Addy and which originally aired from 2002 to 2006, was her longest-running and most successful television show to date.

In 2003, Gertz starred as Brandy, a wanted criminal's girlfriend, in Undercover Christmas, and in 2005 Gertz played the lead role in the TV film Fighting the Odds: The Marilyn Gambrell Story. In 2009–10, she had a recurring role as Marlo Klein, wife of Ari Gold's newest business partner Andrew Klein, an agent at Miller-Gold Talent Agency, on HBO's Entourage. In 2011, she returned to broadcast television with a guest role in the Modern Family episode "Slow Down Your Neighbors". In 2011, she earned a producers' credit on the Academy Award-nominated film A Better Life, which was put in limited release throughout the month of June and early July before arriving on DVD in October.

From 2012 to 2014, Gertz starred in the ABC sitcom The Neighbors in which she played the mother of a human family that moves into a neighborhood populated by residents from another planet.

Personal life
Gertz has been married to billionaire business executive Tony Ressler since 1989. They have three sons: Oliver Jordan Ressler (born 1992), Nicholas Simon Ressler (born 1995), and Theo Ressler (born 1998).

Gertz and her husband are members of the investment group led by Mark Attanasio which purchased the Milwaukee Brewers of Major League Baseball. Gertz-Ressler High Academy, a member of Alliance College-Ready Public Schools, is named for Gertz and her husband. They also became owners of the Atlanta Hawks of the National Basketball Association (NBA) in 2015. Gertz represented the Hawks in the NBA Draft Lottery for the 2018, 2019, and 2020 NBA drafts.

The Giving Back Fund named Gertz and her husband the number-one donor to charity of any celebrity in 2010. Gertz serves as a board director for the Melanoma Research Alliance, the largest nonprofit funder of melanoma research.

Filmography

Film

Television

References

External links
 
 

Atlanta Hawks owners
1965 births
Actresses from Chicago
American child actresses
American film actresses
American television actresses
Jewish American actresses
20th-century American actresses
21st-century American actresses
Living people
21st-century American Jews